Joseph Gordon Phillips (born July 15, 1963) is a former  professional American football defensive tackle who played fourteen seasons in the National Football League (NFL).  After his football career he became an attorney and talk show host. The USA Today All-Joe Team is named in his honor.

References

1963 births
Living people
Players of American football from Portland, Oregon
American football defensive tackles
SMU Mustangs football players
Minnesota Vikings players
San Diego Chargers players
Kansas City Chiefs players
Oregon State Beavers football players
Ed Block Courage Award recipients